General elections were held in Tuvalu on 31 March 2015. The state of emergency created by Cyclone Pam resulted in the election being delayed twice. The election was originally scheduled for 19 March, then after Cyclone Pam caused damage to the islands, the election was rescheduled for 26 March.

Electoral system
The 15 members of Parliament were elected in eight constituencies. Fourteen members were elected under multiple non-transferable vote, while one was elected  using first-past-the-post voting. Seven islands were two-seat constituencies, whilst Nukulaelae was a single-member constituency.

Results
In the Nukufetau electorate the caretaker prime minister, Enele Sopoaga, and the caretaker natural resources minister, Elisala Pita, were not opposed by other candidates. Namoliki Sualiki, the caretaker minister for home affairs and rural development, was not opposed in the Nukulaelae electorate.

The other islands had contested ballots. In the constituencies of Nui and Niutao there were 5 and 6 candidates respectively, including former members of parliament. On Nui Pelenike Isaia and Leneuoti Matusi were not returned to parliament. On Nuitao Vete Sakaio, the deputy-prime minister, was not re-elected; the election was otherwise a good result for the government of Enele Sopoaga.

Enele Sopoaga was sworn in as prime minister and appointed the ministers to the cabinet on 10 April.

References

Elections in Tuvalu
Tuvalu
2015 in Tuvalu
Non-partisan elections
Election and referendum articles with incomplete results